The Habbaniya, or Habbania, are a Sunni Muslims tribe of the nomadic Bedouin Baggara people in the plains of Sudan's Darfur, North Kurdufan, and South Kurdufan provinces

See also
 Baggara

References 

Bedouin groups
Darfur
Baggara tribes